The 2003 Arkansas Razorbacks football team represented the University of Arkansas during the 2003 NCAA Division I-A football season. The Razorbacks played five home games at Donald W. Reynolds Razorback Stadium in Fayetteville, Arkansas and two home games at War Memorial Stadium in Little Rock, Arkansas.

Seven Razorbacks were named to the 2003 All-SEC football team after the regular season: RB Cedric Cobbs, WR George Wilson, TE Jason Peters, OT Shawn Andrews, LB Caleb Miller, CB Ahmad Carroll, and S Tony Bua. Andrews was also awarded the Jacobs Blocking Trophy, given to the best offensive lineman in the SEC, for the second consecutive year. Andrews was also named a consensus All-American for the second straight season as well. The Razorbacks head coach was Houston Nutt, in his sixth season.

Schedule

Roster
QB Matt Jones, Jr.

Game summaries

Tulsa

at No. 6 Texas

North Texas

at Alabama

Auburn

Florida

at Ole Miss

at Kentucky

(Q1, 7:57) ARK DeCori Birmingham 10 yard run (Chris Balseiro kick)
(Q1, 0:10) UK Andrew Hopewell 6 yard blocked punt return (Taylor Begley kick)
(Q2, 8:54) ARK – Richard Smith 26 yard pass from Matt Jones (Chris Balseiro kick)
(Q2, 6:45) ARK – Tom Crowder recovered blocked punt in end zone (Chris Balseiro kick)
(Q3, 3:44) UK – Alexis Bwenge 51 yard pass from Jared Lorenzen (Taylor Begley kick)
(Q4, 7:11) UK – Taylor Begley 34 yard field goal
(Q4, 3:22) ARK – Chris Balseiro 37 yard field goal
(Q4, 1:38) UK – Chris Bernard 13 yard pass from Jared Lorenzen (Taylor Begley kick)
(OT) ARK – Mark Pierce 1 yard run (Chris Balseiro kick)
(OT) UK – Alexis Bwenge 2 yard run (Taylor Begley kick)
(2OT) UK – Alexis Bwenge 7 yard run (Taylor Begley kick)
(2OT) ARK – Jason Peters 7 yard pass from Matt Jones (Chris Balseiro kick)
(3OT) ARK – Chris Balseiro 25 yard field goal
(3OT) UK – Taylor Begley 24 yard field goal
(4OT) UK – Jared Lorenzen 1 yard run (Derek Abney run)
(4OT) ARK – Matt Jones 3 yard run (Mark Pierce pass from Matt Jones)
(5OT) ARK – George Wilson 15 yard pass from Matt Jones (pass failed)
(5OT) UK – Jared Lorenzen 2 yard run (pass failed)
(6OT) UK – Jared Lorenzen 1 yard run (Tommy Cook run)
(6OT) ARK – Mark Pierce 2 yard run (George Wilson pass from Matt Jones)
(7OT) ARK – DeCori Birmingham 25 yard run (Jason Peters pass from Matt Jones)

South Carolina

New Mexico State

Mississippi State

at No. 3 LSU

vs. Missouri — Independence Bowl

(Q1, 8:50) ARK – Chris Balseiro 33 yard field goal
(Q1, 6:50) MIZZ – Zack Abron 1 yard run (Michael Matheny kick)
(Q2, 13:09) ARK – Chris Balseiro 28 yard field goal
(Q2, 7:24) ARK – Matt Jones 1 yard run (George Wilson pass from Matt Jones)
(Q2, 5:59) ARK – Cedric Cobbs 41 yard run (Chris Balseiro kick)
(Q3, 5:21) ARK – Chris Balseiro 25 yard field goal
(Q3, 0:39) MIZZ – Brad Smith 5 yard run (Michael Matheny kick)
(Q4, 12:57) ARK – Chris Balseiro 24 yard field goal

Arkansas RB Cedric Cobbs and LB Caleb Miller were named the bowl games Offensive and Defensive MVP's, respectively.

References

Arkansas
Arkansas Razorbacks football seasons
Independence Bowl champion seasons
Arkansas Razorbacks football